Minor histocompatibility protein HA-1 is a protein that in humans is encoded by the HMHA1 gene.

References

Further reading